Thornhill may refer to:

People
 Thornhill (surname)

Artists
 Thornhill (band)

Places

Canada
 Thornhill, British Columbia
 Thornhill, Maple Ridge, British Columbia
 Thornhill, Nova Scotia
 Thornhill, Ontario
 Thornhill (electoral district)
 Thornhill (provincial electoral district)
 Markham—Thornhill (electoral district)

South Africa
 Thornhill, Kouga, Eastern Cape
 Thornhill, Enoch Mgijima, Eastern Cape

United Kingdom
 Thornhill, Cardiff, Wales
 Thornhill, Cumbria, England
 Thornhill, Derbyshire, England
 Thornhill, Dumfries and Galloway, Scotland
 Thornhill, Southampton, England
 Thornhill, Stirling, Scotland
 Thornhill, Torfaen, Cwmbran, Wales
 Thornhill, West Yorkshire, England
 Thornhill Trojans, amateur rugby league club, Thornhill, West Yorkshire
 Thornhill, Wiltshire, England
 Thornhill Lees, Dewsbury, West Yorkshire, England

United States
 Thornhill (Forkland, Alabama), a historic plantation listed on the National Register of Historic Places
 Thornhill (Talladega, Alabama), a historic plantation listed on the National Register of Historic Places
 Thornhill, Kentucky

Zimbabwe
 Gweru-Thornhill Air Base, formerly Rhodesian Air Force Station Thornhill

Other uses
Thornhill (album), 1999 Moxy Früvous album
Thornhill was the name of a play that John Cassavetes and others were developing in 1983, about Eugene O'Neill
Thornhill College, Derry, Northern Ireland
Thornhill Academy, Sunderland, England
Thornhill Community Academy, West Yorkshire, England
Thornhill Secondary School, Ontario, Canada

See also 
 Thorn Hill, a historic home located near Lexington, Rockbridge County, Virginia
 Thorn Hill, Tennessee